Ullandhaug is a neighborhood (delområde) in the city of Stavanger which lies in the southwestern part of the large municipality of Stavanger in Rogaland county, Norway. It is located along the European route E39 highway in the borough of Hillevåg, south of the lake Mosvatnet.

References

Boroughs and neighbourhoods of Stavanger